Kangra may refer to:

Kangra district, a district of Himachal Pradesh, India
Kangra, Himachal Pradesh, a city and a municipal council in Kangra district now in Indian state of Himachal Pradesh
Kangra Fort, on the outskirts of Kangra
Kangra (Lok Sabha constituency), one of four parliamentary constituencies in Himachal Pradesh
Kangra Valley, a valley in Kangra district
Kangra-Lambagraon, a princely state in British India, in the present-day state of Himachal Pradesh
Kangra, Khyber Pakhtunkhwa, a town in the Khyber Pakhtunkhwa province of Pakistan
Kangra painting, a style originating in Kangra district